A business service provider (BSP) is one of several categories of service provider in the business world. As opposed to an application service provider which provides application components over a computer network, the services provided by a BSP are more in the area of infrastructure: mail delivery, building security, finance, administration, and human services.

Types of business service providers

Back Office BSPs
Back office operations are the off-site delivery of a range of non-core service functions, including routine administration tasks, customer service and technical support. Offshore back office operations involve the ongoing use of an outsourcing base in another country.

Front Office BSPs
The front office is the part of a company that comes in contact with clients, such as the marketing, sales, and service departments. In the hotel industry, the front office (also known as front desk) welcomes guests to the accommodation section: meeting and greeting them, taking and organizing reservations, allocating check in and out of rooms, organizing porter service, issuing keys and other security arrangements, passing on messages to customers and settling the accounts.

Examples
Front Office Solutions Provider

References

General

Further reading 
 
 

Services sector of the economy